Jouko Johannes Salomäki (born 26 August 1962 in Kauhajoki) is a Finnish wrestler and Olympic champion in Greco-Roman wrestling. He was nicknamed "Jokke" during his career.

Salomäki competed at the 1984 Summer Olympics in Los Angeles where he received the gold medal in Greco-Roman wrestling, in the welterweight class. Salomäki won the World Championship in the same weight class in 1987.

References
sports-reference

External links
 

1962 births
Living people
People from Kauhajoki
Olympic wrestlers of Finland
Wrestlers at the 1984 Summer Olympics
Wrestlers at the 1988 Summer Olympics
Finnish male sport wrestlers
Olympic gold medalists for Finland
Olympic medalists in wrestling
Medalists at the 1984 Summer Olympics
Sportspeople from South Ostrobothnia
20th-century Finnish people
21st-century Finnish people